Favartia hidalgoi, common namer : the Hidalgo's Murex, is a species of sea snail, a marine gastropod mollusk in the family Muricidae, the murex snails or rock snails.

Description
The shell size varies between 22 mm and 38 mm

Distribution
This species occurs in the deeper waters of the Gulf of Mexico and in the Atlantic Ocean from North Carolina to Southern Brazil, including the Antilles and Barbados.

References

 Garrigues B . & Lamy D. 2018, 218. Muricidae récoltés au cours de la campagne KARUBENTHOS 2 du MNHN dans les eaux profondes de Guadeloupe (Antilles Françaises) et description de trois nouvelles espèces des genres Pagodula et Pygmaepterys (Mollusca, Gastropoda). Xenophora Taxonomy 20: 34–52

External links
 
 Crosse, H. (1869). Diagnoses Molluscorum novorum. Journal de Conchyliologie. 17: 408-410

Muricidae
Gastropods described in 1869